Chris Beatty (born 21 October 1952) is an Australian cricketer. He played nine first-class matches for New South Wales between 1977/78 and 1978/79.

See also
 List of New South Wales representative cricketers

References

External links
 

1952 births
Living people
Australian cricketers
New South Wales cricketers
Cricketers from Newcastle, New South Wales